The 7th New Jersey Infantry Regiment was an American Civil War infantry regiment from New Jersey that served a three-year enlistment in the Union Army. It was mustered into federal service on September 3, 1861. The regiment trained at Camp Olden in Trenton, before being sent out to join the Army of the Potomac. In the spring of 1862, Company B was disbanded, and the enlisted men were assigned by transfer to different Companies in the Regiment. On June 14, 1862, an independent company, commanded by Captain Edward G. Sloat, then at Alexandria, Va., was assigned to the Regiment, and designated Company B.

Organizing
The 7th New Jersey Infantry Regiment was organized at Camp Olden, Trenton, New Jersey, and mustered in September 3, 1861. Seven companies left State for Washington, D.C., September 19, 1861, and three companies on October 3, 1861.

Attached to:
Casey's Provisional Brigade, Division of the Potomac, to October 1861
3rd Brigade, Hooker's Division, Army of the Potomac, to March 1862
3rd Brigade, 2nd Division, 3rd Army Corps, Army of the Potomac, to March 1864
1st Brigade, 4th Division, 2nd Army Corps, to May 1864
3rd Brigade, 3rd Division, 2nd Army Corps, to July 1865

Original regimental commanders
The following officers led the regiment at the outset. Staff officers, including the Colonel, were generally listed under Company S. Unassigned replacements were listed under Company U.

Colonel Joseph W. Revere
Lieutenant-Colonel Ezra A. Carman
Major J. Dallas McIntosh
Adjutant Francis Price, Jr
Quartermaster Thomas P. Johnston
Surgeon DeWitt D. Hough
Assistant Surgeon Alvin Satterthwait
Assistant Surgeon (originally vacant)
Chaplain Julius D. Rose

Original company commanders
Company A – Captain Louis R. Francine
First Lieutenant Thomas C. Thompson
Second Lieutenant Michael G. Bauer
Company B – Captain John Craven
First Lieutenant William N. Fitzgerald
Second Lieutenant Gardner E. Green
Company C – Captain Henry C. Bartlett
First Lieutenant Warren McChesney
Second Lieutenant William J. Harrison
Company D – Captain John J. Fritschy
First Lieutenant August Mueller
Second Lieutenant Henry Newhouse
Company E – Captain Henry C. Cooper
First Lieutenant Joseph Abott, Jr
Second Lieutenant Daniel Hart
Company F – Captain Frederick Cooper
First Lieutenant Alpheus Witherall
Second Lieutenant Adolphus T. Chazotte
Company G – Captain James McKiernan
First Lieutenant Thomas R. Agnew
Second Lieutenant William J. Evans
Company H – Captain John M. Clark
First Lieutenant Francis M. Dubois
Second Lieutenant Joseph H. Johnson
Company I – Captain Lindsay D. Simmes
First Lieutenant 
Second Lieutenant Henry A. Courson 
Company K – Captain James M. Brown
First Lieutenant William R. Hillyer
Second Lieutenant Michael Mullery
Band – Leader William F. Hutchinson

Service

1861
At Meridian Hill till December 6, 1861.
Expedition to Lower Maryland November 3–11.
Duty at Budd's Ferry, Md., till April 1862.

1862
Moved to the Virginia Peninsula April 5–8
Siege of Yorktown, Va., April 10 – May 4
Battle of Williamsburg May 5
Battle of Fair Oaks (or Seven Pines) May 31 – June 1
Duty near Seven Pines till June 25
Seven days before Richmond June 25 – July 1
Action at Oak Grove (near Seven Pines) June 25
Battle of Savage Station June 29
Battle of Glendale June 30
Battle of Malvern Hill July 1
At Harrison's Landing till August 15
Movement to Centreville, Va., August 15–26
Pope's Campaign in Northern Virginia August 26 – September 2
Action at Bristoe Station (or Kettle Run) August 27
Battle of Groveton August 29
Second Battle of Bull Run August 30
Battle of Chantilly September 1
Duty in the Defences of Washington till November 1
Movement to Falmouth, Va.. November 1–28
Duty near Falmouth November 28 – December 11
Battle of Fredericksburg, Va., December 12–15
Duty near Falmouth till April 27, 1863.

According to the April 4, 1863 issue of the magazine Harper's Weekly, a wedding was held in the 7th New Jersey Volunteers camp while they were camped near Fredericksburg where Union forces were expecting to expel an attack from Fredericksburg, Virginia. The groom, a Captain Daniel Hart, could not get leave to have a proper wedding so the bride, Nellie Lammond, and her bridal party came to camp to be married there. Allegedly, General Hooker was in attendance as well as Sickes, Carr, Mott, and many more officers.

1863
"Mud March" January 20–24
Operations at Rappahannock Bridge and Grove Church February 5–7
Chancellorsville Campaign April 27 – May 6
Battle of Chancellorsville May 1–6
Gettysburg Campaign June 11 – July 24
Battle of Gettysburg July 1–3
Pursuit of Lee to Manassas Gap, Va., July 5–24
Wapping Heights July 23
Duty near Warrenton till October
Bristoe Campaign October 9–22
McLean's Ford October 15
Advance to line of the Rappahannock November 7–8
Kelly's Ford November 7
Mine Run Campaign November 26 – December 2
Payne's Farm November 27
Duty near Brandy Station till May 1864

1864
Demonstration on the Rapidan February 6–7
Campaign from the Rapidan to the James May 3 – June 15
Battle of the Wilderness May 5–7
Battle of Spotsylvania May 8–12
Battle of Spotsylvania Court House May 12–21
Assault on the Salient ("Bloody Angle") May 12
Harris Farm, Fredericksburg Road, May 19
North Anna River May 23–26
Ox Ford May 23–24
On line of the Pamunkey May 26–28
Totopotomoy May 28–31
Cold Harbor June 1–12
Before Petersburg June 16–18
Siege of Petersburg June 16, 1864, to April 2, 1865
Jerusalem Plank Road June 22–23, 1864
Demonstration north of the James July 27–29
Deep Bottom July 27–28
Demonstration north of the James August 13–20
Strawberry Plains, Deep Bottom, August 14–18
Ream's Station August 25
Fort Sedgwick September 10
Poplar Springs Church September 29 – October 2
Yellow House October 2–5
Boydton Plank Road. Hatcher's Run, October 27–28
Warren's Raid on Weldon Railroad December 7–12

1865
Dabney's Mills, Hatcher's Run, February 5–7
Watkins' House March 25
Appomattox Campaign March 28 – April 9
Boydton and White Oak Road March 30–31
Crow's House March 31
Fall of Petersburg April 2
Pursuit of Lee April 3–9
Sailor's Creek April 6
High Bridge, Farmville, April 7
Appomattox Court House April 9
Surrender of Lee and his army
March to Washington, D.C., May 2–12
Grand Review May 23
Duty at Washington, D.C., till July

Disbanding
Mustered out July 17, 1865. Non-Veterans mustered out at Trenton October 7, 1864. <dy_1360>Regiment lost during service 11 Officers and 126 Enlisted men killed and mortally wounded and 2 Officers and 121 Enlisted men by disease. Total 260.

Notes

Sources
http://www.civilwararchive.com/Unreghst/unnjinf2.htm#7thinf

Units and formations of the Union Army from New Jersey
1861 establishments in New Jersey